Mount Derock or Deraak (also known as Kuh-eh Barfee  or Mother Mount) is a sedimentary rock mountain in Shiraz, Fars, in the Middle East region in Iran. It is located west and northwest of Shiraz, Fars. It is called mother mountain because its shape resembles a pregnant women lying and the name  mountain refers to it usually being white-capped in winter,  meaning snow in Persian. The mountain's highest peak is around Shiraz and it is a part of the Zagros Mountains. It is well-known for its sunsets and as the hub for TV and radio telecommunication masts.

Geologically, Shiraz is a syncline valley city (NW–SE elongated) that formed between the Baba Kohi and Derak anticlines.

References

Mountains of Iran
Landforms of Fars Province
Mountains of Fars Province